Ordzhonikidzevsky (masculine), Ordzhonikidzevskaya (feminine), or Ordzhonikidzevskoye (neuter) may refer to:
Ordzhonikidzevsky District, name of several districts in the countries of the former Soviet Union
Ordzhonikidzevsky (inhabited locality) (Ordzhonikidzevskaya, Ordzhonikidzevskoye), name of several inhabited localities in Russia